The Archdeacon of Aberdeen was the only archdeacon in the Diocese of Aberdeen, acting as a deputy of the Bishop of Aberdeen. The archdeacon held the parish church of Rayne as a prebend since 1256. The following is a list of known historical archdeacons:

List of archdeacons of Aberdeen
 Máel Coluim, fl. 1172 x  1179
 Simon, fl. 1189 x 1203
 Omer, fl. x 1207-1208 x
 Máel Coluim, fl. 1224 x 1226-1250 x
 Geoffrey, fl. 1259-1281
 Alan de Moravia, x 1335-1341
 John de Rait, 1342-1350
 Alexander de Kininmund, x 1352-1355
 John Barbour, x 1357-1395
 Henry de Lichton, 1395 - 1396
 Thomas Trail, 1395
 John de Lichton, fl. 1395 x 1402
 David Falconer, x 1407-1411
 Thomas de Tyninghame, 1411-1439
 Walter Stewart, 1440
 Laurence Piot, 1440-1453 x 1454
 James Lindsay	1454-1456
 Laurence Piot (again), 1455-1465 x 1468
 James Inglis, 1468
 Alexander Rait, 1468-1475 x 1479
 Robert Stewart, 1472-1474
 Andrew Young, 1479
 George Brown, 1479
 Robert Blackadder, 1475 x 1479 
 James Lindsay, 1479-1495
 John Fraser, 1480-1488
 Gavin Vaiche, 1485 x 1486
 Gavin Dunbar, 1487
 Adam Elphinstone, 1490/1495 x 1499
 Robert Elphinstone, 1499-1508
 William Dowy, 1499-1500
 Thomas Halkerston, 1508
 Thomas Myrton, 1512-1540
 Patrick Myrton (senior), 1530-1551
 John Stewart,	1551-1563
 James Erskine, 1565-1579
 Robert Murray, 1584-1585
 Walter Abercrombie, 1586-1620
 Walter Richardson, 1586
 Andrew Logie, 1624-1636

Notes

Bibliography
 Watt, D.E.R., Fasti Ecclesiae Scotinanae Medii Aevi ad annum 1638, 2nd Draft, (St Andrews, 1969), pp. 18-21

See also
 Bishop of Aberdeen

Aberdeen
Christianity in Aberdeen
People associated with Aberdeen